This is a list of the most notable films produced by the cinema of Georgia, ordered according to decade of release.

1909 to 1919
Georgian films before 1920

1920s
Georgian films of the 1920s

1930s
Georgian films of the 1930s

1940s
Georgian films of the 1940s

1950s
Georgian films of the 1950s

1960s
Georgian films of the 1960s

1970s
Georgian films of the 1970s

1980s
Georgian films of the 1980s

1990s
Georgian films of the 1990s

2000s
Georgian films of the 2000s

2010s
Georgian films of the 2010s

2020s
Georgian films of the 2020s

See also
 List of Georgian film studios
 List of Georgian actors

External links
 Library of National filmography
 Georgian film at the Internet Movie Database
 http://www.babaduli.de